When Abdal-Latif Mirza reached Damghan, the prefect sealed the city and showed his opposition. After a skirmish and siege, the prince took the city by force and gave it over to general plunder. From Damghan, Abdal-Latif Mirza went to Bistam. At this city he learned of the progress made by Abul-Qasim Babur Mirza who had taken Jurjan and Mazandaran and thereby cut-off Abdal-Latif Mirza's path north to Samarkand. Abdul-Latif Mirza now had no choice but to move east arriving at Nishapur where he learned that Ala al-Dawla Mirza had taken Mashad. He was now completely encircled, he had nowhere to go. Finally he was attacked at Nishapur on 20 April 1447 by Ala al-Dawla Mirza's army and defeated.

Damghan 1447
Damghan 1447
1447 in Asia
Damghan 1447